Funk is a German surname.

People with the surname
Aaron Funk, Canadian electronic musician
Allan Funk, American professional wrestler
Annie Clemmer Funk (1874–1912), Mennonite missionary in India, perished with the Titanic
Casimir Funk (1884–1967), Polish biochemist
 The Funk family of American professional wrestlers:
 Dory Funk (1919–1973), family patriarch
 Dory Funk Jr. (born 1942), real-life older son
 Terry Funk (born 1944), real-life younger son also known as "The Funker"
 Jimmy Jack Funk (born 1959), kayfabe younger son (real name Ferrin Barr Jr.)
Eric Funk (born 1949), American contemporary classical composer
Franz Xaver von Funk (1840–1907), German church historian
Fred Funk (born 1956), American professional golfer
Håkan Funk (born 1962), Swedish curler
Heinrich Funk (1807-1877), German landscape painter
Isaac Funk (1797-1865), American politician, pioneer and rancher
Isaac Kaufmann Funk (1839–1912), American editor, lexicographer, publisher and spelling reformer
Jake Funk (born 1998), American football player
Joe Funk (c.1914–1981), American lithography printmaker and muralist.
Joseph Funk (1778–1862), American music teacher and publisher
Michael Funk, Canadian ice hockey player
Neil Funk (born 1946), American basketball announcer Chicago Bulls (1991-2020)
Nolan Gerard Funk (born 1986), American actor
Paul Funk (1886–1969), Austrian mathematician
Paul E. Funk (born 1940), American general
Paul E. Funk II (born 1962), American general
Rydel Funk (née Lynch) (born 1993), American singer, musician and television actress, member of pop rock band R5
Robert W. Funk (1926–2005), American religious scholar
Tom Funk, American Major League baseball player
Vicki Funk (born 1947), American botanist
Wally Funk (born 1939), American aviator and Goodwill Ambassador
Walther Funk (1890–1960), Nazi official
Wes Funk (1969-2015), Canadian writer
Wilfred John Funk (1883–1965), American author and publisher, son of Isaac Kaufmann Funk
Wilhelm Heinrich Funk (1866–1949), German-American portrait painter
Wolf-Peter Funk (1943–2021), German-Canadian religious scholar and Coptologist

See also
 Funk (disambiguation)
 Funke
 Funcke

German-language surnames
Russian Mennonite surnames